Hyosoma is a genus of parasitic flies in the family Tachinidae.

Distribution
Argentina, Chile

References

Dexiinae
Diptera of South America
Tachinidae genera
Monotypic Brachycera genera
Taxa named by John Merton Aldrich